The 43rd Karlovy Vary International Film Festival took place from 4 to 12 July 2008. The Crystal Globe was won by Terribly Happy, a Danish neo-noir film directed by Henrik Ruben Genz. The second prize, the Special Jury Prize was won by The Photograph, an Indonesian drama directed by Nan Achnas.

Juries
The following people formed the juries of the festival: 
Main competition
Ivan Passer, Grand Jury President (Czech-born, USA)
Brenda Blethyn (UK)
Ari Folman (Israel)
Ted Hope (USA)
Jan P. Muchow (Italy)
Johanna ter Steege (Netherlands)
Vilmos Zsigmond (Hungary, USA)
Documentaries
Jørgen Leth, Chairman (Denmark)
 Sean Farnel (Canada)
 Elda Guidinetti (Switzerland)
 Kanako Hayashi (Japan)
 Erika Hníková (Czech Republic)
East of the West
 Peter Hames, Chairman (United Kingdom)
 Milena Andonova (Bulgaria)
 Éva Bársony (Hungary)
 Annamaria Percavassi (Italy)
 Vratislav Šlajer (Czech Republic)

Official selection awards
The following feature films and people received the official selection awards:
 Crystal Globe (Grand Prix) -  Terribly Happy (Frygtelig lykkelig) by Henrik Ruben Genz (Denmark)
 Special Jury Prize -  The Photograph by Nan Achnas (Indonesia, France, Netherlands, Switzerland, Sweden)
 Best Director Award - Alexey Uchitel for Captive (Plennyj) (Russia, Bulgaria)
 Best Actress Award - Martha Issová for Night Owls (Děti noci) (Czech Republic)
 Best Actor Award - Jiří Mádl for Night Owls (Děti noci) (Czech Republic)
 Special mention of the jury (ex aequo): The Investigator (A nyomozó) by Attila Gigor (Hungary, Sweden, Ireland) & The Karamazovs (Karamazovi) by Petr Zelenka (Czech Republic, Poland)

Other statutory awards
Other statutory awards that were conferred at the festival:
 Best documentary film (over 30 min) - Man on Wire by James Marsh (UK)
 Special mention -  Bigger Stronger Faster* by Christopher Bell (USA)
 Best documentary film (under 30 min) - Lost World (Letűnt világ) by Gyula Nemes (Hungary, Finland)
 East of the West Award - Tulpan by Sergey Dvortsevoy (Kazakhstan, Germany, Switzerland, Russia, Poland)
 Special Mention - Seamstresses (Šivački) by Lyudmil Todorov (Bulgaria)
 Crystal Globe for Outstanding Artistic Contribution to World Cinema - Robert De Niro (USA), Dušan Hanák (Slovakia), Juraj Jakubisko (Slovakia), Ivan Passer (USA)
 Festival President's Award - Danny Glover (USA), Christopher Lee (UK), Armin Mueller-Stahl (Germany)
 The Town of Karlovy Vary Award - Armin Mueller-Stahl (Germany)
 Právo Audience Award - 12 by Nikita Mikhalkov (Russia)

Non-statutory awards
The following non-statutory awards were conferred at the festival:
 FIPRESCI International Critics Award: The Karamazovs (Karamazovi) by Petr Zelenka (Czech Republic, Poland)
 Ecumenical Jury Award: The Photograph by Nan Achnas (Indonesia, France, Netherlands, Switzerland, Sweden)
 Don Quixote Award: The Investigator (A nyomozó) by Attila Gigor (Hungary, Sweden, Ireland)
 Europa Cinemas Label: Bahrtalo! (en. Good Luck!) by Róbert Lakatos (Hungary, Austria, Germany)
 Czech TV Award - Independent Camera:  Mermaid (Rusalka) by Anna Melikyan (Russia)
 NETPAC Award: Written by Kim Byung-woo (South Korea) & Tulpan by Sergey Dvortsevoy (Kazakhstan, Germany, Switzerland, Russia, Poland)

References

2008 film awards
Karlovy Vary International Film Festival